Francis Vane Hughes, Jr. (9 February 1921 – 1 April 2008) was an Australian rules footballer who played with Richmond and Melbourne in the Victorian Football League (VFL). He was the son of Australian Football Hall of Fame member Frank 'Checker' Hughes.

Notes

External links 

1921 births
2008 deaths
Australian rules footballers from Melbourne
Richmond Football Club players
Melbourne Football Club players
Williamstown Football Club players
People from Brunswick, Victoria